Phylloporia may refer to:
 Phylloporia (fungus), a genus of polypore fungus in the family Hymenochaetaceae
 Phylloporia (moth), a genus of moth in the family Incurvariidae